Stenoporpia is a genus of moths in the family Geometridae erected by James Halliday McDunnough in 1920.

Species
Stenoporpia pulchella (Grossbeck, 1909)
Stenoporpia margueritae Rindge, 1968
Stenoporpia asymmetra Rindge, 1959
Stenoporpia dionaria (Barnes & McDunnough, 1918)
Stenoporpia polygrammaria (Packard, 1876)
Stenoporpia mediatra Rindge, 1958
Stenoporpia dissonaria (Hulst, 1896)
Stenoporpia anastomosaria (Grossbeck, 1908)
Stenoporpia pulmonaria (Grote, 1881)
Stenoporpia purpuraria (Barnes & McDunnough, 1913)
Stenoporpia vernata (Barnes & McDunnough, 1917)
Stenoporpia vernalell McDunnough, 1940
Stenoporpia insipidaria McDunnough, 1945
Stenoporpia anellula (Barnes & McDunnough, 1917)
Stenoporpia badia Rindge, 1968
Stenoporpia macdunnoughi Sperry, 1938
Stenoporpia blanchardi Rindge, 1968
Stenoporpia glaucomarginaria McDunnough, 1945
Stenoporpia separataria (Grote, 1883)
Stenoporpia excelsaria (Strecker, 1899)
Stenoporpia larga Rindge, 1968
Stenoporpia graciella McDunnough, 1940
Stenoporpia lea Rindge, 1968

References

Boarmiini
Taxa named by James Halliday McDunnough